Hartwell is a city in Hart County, Georgia, United States. The population was 4,469 at the 2010 census. The city is the county seat of Hart County.

History
Hartwell was founded in 1854 as seat of the newly formed Hart County. It was incorporated as a town in 1856 and as a city in 1904. The town was named for Revolutionary War figure Nancy Morgan Hart.

Geography
Hartwell is located in central Hart County at  (34.352738, -82.931161).

U.S. Route 29 passes through the center of Hartwell, leading east  to the South Carolina border at Hartwell Dam on the Savannah River, and southwest  to Royston. Georgia State Route 51 also passes through Hartwell, leading north  to Reed Creek and west  to Bowersville.

Climate

Demographics

2020 census

As of the 2020 United States Census, there were 4,470 people, 1,592 households, and 1,013 families residing in the city.

2000 census
As of the census of 2010, there were 4,469 people.  There were 2,266 housing units.  The racial makeup of the city was 61.33% White, 34.53% African American, 0.13% Native American, 0.62% Asian, 0% Pacific Islander, 0.33% from other races, and 1.77% from two or more races. Hispanic or Latino of any race were 3.07% of the population.

The median income for a household in the city was $29,128 and the median income for a family was $45,909. The per capita income for the city was $18,937.  About 15.4% of families and 23.1% of the population were below the poverty line, including 21.5% of those under age 18 and 20.6% of those age 65 or over.

Education

Hart County School District 
The Hart County School District holds pre-school to grade twelve, and consists of three elementary schools, a middle school, a high school, and an academy school. The district has 230 full-time teachers and over 3,564 students.
Hartwell Elementary School
North Hart Elementary School
South Hart Elementary School
Hart County Middle School
Hart County High School
Hart County Academy

Hart County Public Library
The Hart County Public Library was begun in 1938 with rooms over Homer Herndon's drug store, then moved to the County Courthouse in 1941 until 1968 when the courthouse burned down. It was then located in the County School Board building until funds were raised for a permanent building in 1975.

Notable people

 Donald Burdick, retired Army major general and director of the Army National Guard
 Mike Hubbard, Former Speaker of the Alabama House of Representatives and convicted felon

References

External links

 
Cities in Georgia (U.S. state)
Cities in Hart County, Georgia
County seats in Georgia (U.S. state)
1854 establishments in Georgia (U.S. state)